Harold Thomas McPhail (October 26, 1912 – August 1977) was an American football fullback in the National Football League for the Boston Redskins. He played college football at Xavier University and the United States Military Academy.

Players of American football from Columbus, Ohio
American football running backs
Boston Redskins players
1912 births
1977 deaths